Morinda tinctoria, commonly known as aal or Indian mulberry (though these common names also refer to Morinda citrifolia), is a species of flowering plant in the family Rubiaceae, native to southern Asia.

It is an evergreen shrub or small tree growing to 5–10 m tall. The leaves are 15–25 cm long, oblong to lanceolate. The flowers are tubular, white, scented, about 2 cm long. The fruit is a green syncarp, 2-2.5 cm diameter.

The plant is extensively cultivated in India in order to make the morindone dye sold  under the trade name "Suranji". Morindone is used for the dyeing of cotton, silk and wool in shades of red, chocolate or purple. The colouring matter is found principally in the root bark and is collected when the plants reach three to four years of age. If the trees are allowed to mature then hardly any colouring substance remains. The small roots yield the most dye and those above about 1 cm diameter are discarded. The active substance is extracted as the glucoside known as morindin that upon hydrolysis produces the dye. Morindone is a mordant dye giving a yellowish-red colour with an aluminium mordant, chocolate with a chromium mordant, and dull purple to black with an iron mordant.

Morindin is also present in Morinda umbellata but not in Morinda longiflora, a native of West Africa. Although imported into Britain and applied to wool and cotton, the dye did not find commercial success.

References

trinctoria
Plant dyes